The Australian Military Forces (AMF) was the official name of the Army of Australia from 1916 to 1980. This encompassed both the (full-time) "regular army", and the (part-time) forces, variously known during this period as the Militia, the Citizen Military Forces (CMF) and the Australian Citizen Military Force (ACMF).

Initially this also included the Australian Flying Corps (AFC) as part of the Australian Imperial Force (AIF). In 1920, the AFC became the Australian Air Corps, which became the Royal Australian Air Force (RAAF) on 31 March 1921. The land forces of Australia were renamed the Australian Army in 1980. In detail:

References

Military units and formations of Australia